Shortening is any fat that is a solid at room temperature and used to make crumbly pastry and other food products.

The idea of shortening dates back to at least the 18th century, well before the invention of modern, shelf-stable vegetable shortening.  In the earlier centuries, lard was the primary ingredient used to shorten dough. The reason it is called shortening is that it makes the resulting food crumbly, or to behave as if it had short fibers. Solid fat prevents cross-linkage between gluten molecules.  This cross-linking would give dough elasticity, so it could be stretched into longer pieces.  In pastries such as cake, which should not be elastic, shortening is used to produce the desired texture.

History and market

Originally shortening was synonymous with lard, but with the invention of margarine from beef tallow by French chemist Hippolyte Mège-Mouriès in 1869, margarine also came to be included in the term. Since the invention of hydrogenated vegetable oil in the early 20th century, "shortening" has come almost exclusively to mean hydrogenated vegetable oil. Modern margarine is made mainly of refined seed oil and water, and may also contain milk. Vegetable shortening shares many properties with lard: both are semi-solid fats with a higher smoke point than butter and margarine. They contain less water and are thus less prone to splattering, making them safer for frying. Lard and shortening have a higher fat content compared to about 80% for butter and margarine. Cake margarines and shortenings tend to contain a few percent of monoglycerides whereas other margarines typically have less. Such "high ratio shortenings" blend better with hydrophilic ingredients such as starches and sugar.

Hydrogenation of organic substances was first developed by the French chemist Paul Sabatier in 1897, and in 1901 the German chemist Wilhelm Normann developed the hydrogenation of fats, which he patented in 1902. In 1907, a German chemist, Edwin Cuno Kayser, moved to Cincinnati, Ohio, the home town of soap manufacturer Procter & Gamble. He had worked for British soap manufacturer Joseph Crosfield and Sons and was well acquainted with Normann's process, as Crosfield and Sons owned the British rights to Normann's patent. Soon after arriving, Kayser made a business deal with Procter & Gamble, and presented the company with two processes to hydrogenate cottonseed oil, with the intent of creating a raw material for soap. Since the product looked like lard, Procter & Gamble instead began selling it as a vegetable fat for cooking purposes in June 1911, calling it "Crisco", a modification of the phrase "crystallized cottonseed oil".

While similar to lard, vegetable shortening was much cheaper to produce. Shortening also required no refrigeration, which further lowered its costs and increased its appeal in a time when refrigerators were rare. With these advantages, plus an intensive advertisement campaign by Procter & Gamble, Crisco quickly gained popularity in American households. As food production became increasingly industrialized and manufacturers sought low-cost raw materials, the use of vegetable shortening also became common in the food industry. In addition, vast US government-financed surpluses of cottonseed oil, corn oil, and soybeans also helped create a market in low-cost vegetable shortening.

Crisco, owned by The J.M. Smucker Company since 2002, remains the best-known brand of shortening in the US, nowadays consisting of a blend of partially and fully hydrogenated soybean and palm oils. In Ireland and the UK, Trex is a popular brand, while in Australia, Copha is popular, made primarily from coconut oil.

Shortened dough
A short dough is one that is crumbly or mealy. The opposite of a short dough is a "long" dough, one that stretches. 

Vegetable shortening (or butter, or other solid fats) can produce both types of dough; the difference is in technique. To produce a short dough, which is commonly used for tarts, the shortening is cut into the flour with a pastry blender, pair of table knives, fingers, or other utensil until the resulting mixture has a fine, cornmeal-like texture. For a long dough, the shortening is cut in only until the pea-sized crumbs are formed, or even larger lumps may be included. After cutting in the fat, the liquid (if any) is added and the dough is shaped for baking.

Neither short dough nor long flake dough are considered to be creamed or stirred batters.

Health concerns and reformulation
In the early 21st century, vegetable shortening became the subject of some health concerns due to its traditional formulation from partially hydrogenated vegetable oils that contain trans fat, a type not found in significant amounts in any naturally occurring food that have been linked to a number of adverse health effects. Consequently, a low trans fat variant of Crisco was introduced in 2004. In January 2007, all Crisco products were reformulated to contain less than one gram of trans fat per serving, and the separately marketed trans-fat free version introduced in 2004 was consequently discontinued. In 2006, Cookeen was also reformulated to remove trans fats.

See also 
 Spread (food)

References

Bibliography

 William Shurtleff and Akiko Aoyagi, 2007. History of Soy Oil Shortening: A Special Report on The History of Soy Oil, Soybean Meal, & Modern Soy Protein Products, from the unpublished manuscript, History of Soybeans and Soy foods: 1100 B.C. to the 1980s.  Lafayette, California (US): Soyinfo Center.

Cooking fats